Nationality words link to articles with information on the nation's poetry or literature (for instance, Irish or France).

Events
 June–October – James Macpherson makes his first tour of the Scottish Highlands and Islands to seek out traditional Gaelic poetry.
 October 25 – With the death of King George II of Great Britain, the era of Augustan poetry and Augustan literature, which started in 1702, is considered to have ended.

Works published
 James Beattie, Original Poems and Translations
 John Cleland, The Times!, Volume 1, a verse satire
 George Cockings, War, an Heroic Poem, from the Taking of Minorca by the French to the Reduction of the Havannah, a 28-page poem supporting British generals; the poem would be republished three more times by 1765; English Colonial America
 George Colman, the elder, and Robert Lloyd, Two Odes, Part 1: "To Obscurity", Part 2: "To Oblivion", parodying Thomas Gray
 John Delap, Elegies
 Jupiter Hammon, An Evening Thought, the first poem published by an African American in English Colonial America; printed as a broadside; the poem's meter was common in Great Awakening sermons and African American a cappella hymns
 Robert Lloyd:
 The Actor, published anonymously, a popular poem of its time
 The Tears and Triumphs of Parnassus
 James Macpherson, Fragments of Ancient Poetry Collected in the Highlands of Scotland
 James Scott, Heaven: A vision, Seatonian Prize winner
 John Scott, Four Elegies: Descriptive and Moral, published anonymously
 Anne Steele, published under the name "Theodosia", Poems on Subjects Chiefly Devotional, two volumes; she donated her earnings from the book to charity, Colonial America
 The Famous Tommy Thumb's Little Story-book, with "Little Boy Blue"

Births
Death years link to the corresponding "[year] in poetry" article:
 January 6 – Richard Polwhele, English clergyman, poet and topographer (died 1838)
 March 2 – Christina Charlotta Cederström, Swedish hostess of a salon, poet and painter
 March 10 – Leandro Fernández de Moratín, Spanish dramatist, translator and neoclassical poet (died 1828)
 May 10
 Johann Peter Hebel, German poet (died 1826)
 Claude Joseph Rouget de Lisle, French poet, composer (died 1836)
October 26 – Maria Petronella Woesthoven, Dutch poet (died 1830)

Deaths
Birth years link to the corresponding "[year] in poetry" article:
 February 14 – Isaac Hawkins Browne (born 1705), English poet
 May 9 – Nikolaus Ludwig von Zinzendorf (born 1700), German
 Date unknown – Bharatchandra Ray (born 1712), Bengali and Sanskrit poet and song composer

See also

Poetry
List of years in poetry

Notes

18th-century poetry
Poetry